Camiaca Peak is an 11,739-foot-elevation (3,578 meter) mountain summit located on the crest of the Sierra Nevada mountain range in northern California, United States. The peak is situated on the common boundary shared by Yosemite National Park with Hoover Wilderness, as well as the border shared by Mono County with Tuolumne County. It is approximately two miles east of Virginia Peak, three miles west of Dunderberg Peak, and Summit Lake lies at the base of the southeast slope.

History

The first ascent of the summit was made in 1917 by Walter L. Huber.

This mountain's toponym was officially adopted in 1932 by the United States Board on Geographic Names. The word "camiaca" possibly derives from the Southern Sierra Miwok "kamyaka" which means "yarrow" (a flowering plant).

Climate
Camiaca Peak is located in an alpine climate zone. Most weather fronts originate in the Pacific Ocean, and travel east toward the Sierra Nevada mountains. As fronts approach, they are forced upward by the peaks (orographic lift), causing moisture in the form of rain or snowfall to drop onto the range. Precipitation runoff from this mountain drains west into Return Creek, and east to Green Creek which is a tributary of Walker River.

See also

 List of mountain peaks of California

References

External links
 Weather forecast: Camiaca Peak

Mountains of Mono County, California
Mountains of Tuolumne County, California
Mountains of Yosemite National Park
North American 3000 m summits
Mountains of Northern California
Sierra Nevada (United States)
Humboldt–Toiyabe National Forest